Thakur Jagdev Chand was a stalwart leader of Bharatiya Janata Party from Himachal Pradesh, India. He was elected to Himachal Pradesh Legislative Assembly from Hamirpur and served as cabinet minister in Government of Himachal Pradesh. He was elected five times uninterrupted. He died in 1993, soon after his fifth victory.

During his first term as an MLA and a Cabinet Minister in state government in June 1977, he was given portfolio of Public Transport. He was the one who pioneered the idea of introducing Passenger insurance scheme. He was astonished to know that surviving victims after a bus accident (this was first accident during his term as Cabinet Minister) were only given Rs2000. Passenger insurance scheme ensured that survivors will get at least Rs25000 in 1977. Amount was then further revised to higher values by successive governments. It was under his tenure when Himachal Road Transport Corporation made profit for the first time.

For a leader who was well respected by masses and is still remembered for his contribution, state government named Sujanpur degree college after him, Thakur Jagdev Chand Memorial Government College. Hamirpur town hall is also named after Late Thakur Jagdev Chand. RSS also opened a History research institute based in Neri which was also named after him.

References

1993 deaths
People from Hamirpur district, Himachal Pradesh
State cabinet ministers of Himachal Pradesh
Bharatiya Jana Sangh politicians
Bharatiya Janata Party politicians from Himachal Pradesh
Janata Party politicians
Himachal Pradesh MLAs 1977–1982
Himachal Pradesh MLAs 1982–1985
Himachal Pradesh MLAs 1985–1990
Himachal Pradesh MLAs 1990–1992
Himachal Pradesh MLAs 1993–1998
1923 births